In Meetei society, the sagei or family name is known as Yumnak in Meetei Language. Pronounced "yoom-naak". Ethnic yumnaks are used in the Meetei /Meitei community including the Meitei Pangal and Meitei Bamon (Manipuri Brahmin). The Meitei community lie largely in the Northeast India, mainly in Manipur, Next in Assam, Tripura and a few in Mizoram, Nagaland, Meghalaya. Some live in Bangladesh and Myanmar.

Historical background
In Meetei society, all the yumnak belong to only one of the Salai Taret except the Yumnak of the Meitei Bamon (Manipuri Brahmin) including Kshetrimayum. There are seven major Salais or Yek Salais or Salai Taret, namely :
 Mangang 
 Luwang
 Khuman
 Angom
 Moirang
 Kha Nganba
 Sarang Leishangthem (Chenglei).
Yumnaks are the sub-clans of these seven major Salai, formed by the collection of different Yumnaks. Yumnaks inhabited specific areas and formed collectives. Later, these family members migrated to different areas, dispersing their Yumnaks.

Unique Naming System
From ancient immemorial time, based on Meitei custom, naming system differs between males and females.

Commonly, in both the genders the person's Yumnak is used as a prefix to their name. Keeping their respective names in the middle. The suffix name part is the one differing from males to females.

In females, the suffix name part is made either by the gender identification or marital status identification like "Chanu". After getting married, the females changed their suffix part to "Leima", adding the term "Ningol" just after her paternal surname and by adding "Ongbi" after her husband's surname completes her full name.

Examples :

A female Meitei having the name Leishna with Khaidem as her paternal Yumnak will have her full name, before getting married, as per the Meitei custom as,
 Khaidem Leishna Chanu
After getting married, assuming, she married Narumbam Sanathoi Angomcha, noting that Narumbam is her husband's surname, Sanathoi is her husband's name and Angom is her husband's Salai/Clan name. Then, her full name as per the Meitei custom will be changed as,
 Khaidem Ningol Narumbam Ongbi Leishna Leima
NOTE : The females don't carry their Salai/Clan name because the Salai/Clan system is a patrilineality one.

In males, the suffix is made either by the name of their respective Salai or gender identification like "Meitei/Meetei" for males. And sometimes by adding "cha" to their respective Salai or Clan name. "Cha" meaning "child".

Examples: A male Meitei having the name Ahenba with 'sougrakpam as Yumnak, and noting that 'sougrakpam surname belongs to Mangang clan, will have his full name as per the Meitei custom as,
Sougrakpam Ahenba Mangang or
Sougrankpam Ahenba Meitei or
Sougrakpam Ahenba Meetei or
Sougrakpam Ahenba Mangangcha

Through these Yumnaks, the genealogy of Meitei can be traced.

See also
History of Manipur
Kakching Khunou
Meitei people
Indian name

References

Further reading
KOUBA ANGANGNGA was neither PANGAL MAR nor PANGAL.
Infotechnology
OBC in Manipur — III, the Sangai Express, 29 August 2009.
Chieftainship among the Meiteis & Mizos - VII, the Sangai Express, 27 October 2009
What's in a name? By: Huidrom Kenajit
Beyond the Margins, Book Preview By: Akendra Sana
Use of Imported Titles Misleading Manipuri Culture? By: KO
Feminism in a traditional society: women of the Manipur Valley by Manjusri Chaki-Sircar, 1984.
Valley society of Manipur: a cultural frontier of Indian civilization by Ranajit Kumar Saha, 1994.
Encyclopaedia of North-East India: Manipur by Hamlet Bareh, 2001.
Chieftainship among the Meiteis & Mizos by Dr. (Mrs.) Priyadarshni M Gangte
Yumnak Story
Note on the Manipuri "Yek" by Lieut-Colonel J. Shakespear, CIE., D.S.O.
The Religion of Manipur by J. Shakespear, Folklore, Vol. 24, No. 4 December 1913, pp. 409–455, Taylor & Francis, Ltd.

Meitei language
Surnames
Indian families
Meitei surnames